John Reidy (8 November 1875 – 21 June 1910) was an Irish hurler who played as a goalkeeper for the Limerick senior team.

Born in Ballingarry, County Limerick, Reidy first played competitive hurling in his youth. He was a regular for the Limerick senior hurling team during a successful period at the end of the 19th century. During his inter-county career he won one All-Ireland medal and one Munster medal.

At club level Reidy was a stalwart of the Ballingarry team.

In retirement from playing Reidy became involved in the administrative affairs of the Gaelic Athletic Association, having served as president of the Limerick County Board.

Honours

Limerick
All-Ireland Senior Hurling Championship (1): 1897
Munster Senior Hurling Championship (1): 1897

References

1875 births
1910 deaths
Limerick inter-county hurlers
Hurling goalkeepers
All-Ireland Senior Hurling Championship winners
Ballingarry hurlers